Lepsi is a dish from Circassian cuisine, eaten mainly in the Düzce area by both Circassian and Turkish people. The ingredients are beef, onion, red pepper, rice, salt, and water.

References

Turkish cuisine
Circassian cuisine